Sean Parker (born 5 September 1997) is an Italian professional footballer who plays as a forward for  club Aurora Pro Patria 1919.

Club career
Born in Ronciglione, from English father and Italian mother, started his senior career for San Nicolò in Serie D.

On 29 January 2019, he joined Serie C club Pro Patria as a free agent. On 25 August 2021, he extended his contract until 2023.

References

External links
 
 

1997 births
Living people
Sportspeople from the Province of Viterbo
Italian people of English descent
Footballers from Lazio
Italian footballers
Association football forwards
Serie C players
Serie D players
Delfino Pescara 1936 players
S.S.C. Bari players
S.S. Monopoli 1966 players
Lucchese 1905 players
U.S. Massese 1919 players
Aurora Pro Patria 1919 players